PomPom Games was an indie video game developer based in the United Kingdom. Originally a developer of classic arcade-style games for the PC, they are most well known for Mutant Storm Reloaded (2005), a new version of their popular 2002 PC game, Mutant Storm. They developed games for multiple platforms: PC, Xbox, PS3, and now mobile.

A special version of their award-winning game Space Tripper was developed to work with the Exertris exercise-gaming bike so that the ship's firepower was linked to the user's pedaling effort.

Games

Space Tripper (2001)
Mutant Storm (2002)
Mutant Storm Reloaded (2005)
Bliss Island (2006/8)
Mutant Storm Empire (2007)
Astro Tripper (2008) 
Alien Zombie Death (2010)
Alien Zombie Megadeath (2011)

External links
Official PomPom Games Website

Defunct video game companies of the United Kingdom
Video game development companies